Stefan Klos (born 16 August 1971) is a German former professional footballer who played as a goalkeeper.

His seventeen-year career was spent with Borussia Dortmund and Rangers. He won 16 major trophies in total, including four Scottish Premier League titles and the 1997 Champions League.

Club career

Borussia Dortmund
Born in Dortmund, Klos arrived at Borussia Dortmund in the summer of 1990, from neighbouring TSC Eintracht Dortmund. He made his Bundesliga debut on 4 May 1991 at only 19, in a 2–2 home draw against SG Wattenscheid 09.

Klos became first choice in 1991–92, relegating Wolfgang de Beer to the bench. He appeared in 31 games that season as his team finished runners-up, going on to win back-to-back national championships during his spell.

As well as playing every match in 1996–97 for the third-placed side, Klos added 11 in that season's UEFA Champions League as they won the tournament for the first time. He left the club with 339 competitive appearances, and 114 clean sheets.

Rangers
On 24 December 1998, Klos signed with Scottish club Rangers on a contract that made him one of the highest-earning players in Europe. He replaced Lionel Charbonnier as starter and was nicknamed 'Der Goalie', a play on Andy Goram's nickname 'The Goalie'. He won his first Scottish Premier League title that season.

Rangers won the treble in 2002–03, with Klos again the starter. He was appointed team captain in July 2004. Six months later he picked up a knee ligament injury in training, missing the remainder of the campaign and being replaced by Ronald Waterreus; the Dutchman retained his place after he regained full fitness.

Klos looked set to challenge new signing Lionel Letizi after Paul Le Guen's arrival at the start of 2006–07, but he suffered a biking injury which gave long-term third choice Allan McGregor the chance to play. On 22 February 2007, he made his first appearance of the season for the first team against Hapoel Tel Aviv FC in the round of 32 of the UEFA Cup, after McGregor was sent off in a 4–0 home win.

Klos left Ibrox Stadium at the end of the campaign after eight and a half years, having played in 298 games in all competitions. He retired at the age of 36, and subsequently settled in Switzerland. 

In 2009, Klos was inducted into the club's Hall of Fame.

Honours
Borussia Dortmund
Bundesliga: 1994–95, 1995–96
UEFA Champions League: 1996–97
Intercontinental Cup: 1997
DFL-Supercup: 1995, 1996
UEFA Cup runner-up: 1992–93

Rangers
Scottish Premier League: 1998–99, 1999–00, 2002–03, 2004–05
Scottish Cup: 1998–99, 1999–2000, 2001–02, 2002–03
Scottish League Cup: 2001–02, 2002–03

References

External links

1971 births
Living people
West German footballers
German footballers
Footballers from Dortmund
Association football goalkeepers
Bundesliga players
Borussia Dortmund players
Borussia Dortmund II players
Scottish Premier League players
Rangers F.C. players
UEFA Champions League winning players
Germany under-21 international footballers
German expatriate footballers
Expatriate footballers in Scotland
German expatriate sportspeople in Scotland